Emosi Tuqiri (born 28 December 2000) is a Fijian rugby union player, currently playing for the . His preferred position is prop.

Early career
Described as a rugby prodigy and potential future Wallaby, Tuqiri studied and played Marist College Ashgrove and played for the Brothers rugby club in Brisbane.

Tuqiri is the son of former Brisbane Broncos and Waratahs player Elia Tuqiri, and the cousin of former Wallaby Lote Tuqiri. He is also related to the Kuridrani brothers Kirisi and Tevita, while also a relative of Noa Nadruku and Nemani Nadolo.

Professional career
After a spell in the Queensland Reds academy, Tuqiri was named as a squad member of the Melbourne Rebels in 2022. Tuqiri signed with the Fijian Drua in October 2022, ahead of the 2023 Super Rugby Pacific season. He made his Drua debut in Round 1 of 2023, against Moana Pasifika.

In 2019, Tuqiri represented the Fiji U20 national side in the 2019 World Rugby Under 20 Championship.

References

External links
itsrugby.co.uk Profile

2000 births
Living people
Fijian rugby union players
Rugby union props
Melbourne Rebels players
Fijian Drua players